Dumalag, officially the Municipality of Dumalag (Capiznon/Hiligaynon: Banwa sang Dumalag), is a 4th class municipality in the province of Capiz, Philippines. According to the 2020 census, it has a population of 30,098 people.

It is the birthplace of Jose Advincula, a cardinal of the Roman Catholic church appointed as the Archbishop of Manila in 2021.

Geography

Barangays
Dumalag is politically subdivided into 19 barangays.

Climate

Demographics

Economy

References

External links
 [ Philippine Standard Geographic Code]
Philippine Census Information

Municipalities of Capiz